Westerville City Schools serves Westerville, Minerva Park, Blendon Township, portions of Columbus, and other nearby rural areas. Though the district is situated in northern Franklin County, it also serves much of Genoa Township in southern Delaware County. The district is the 12th largest in Ohio.

On the 09–10 state report card, Westerville City Schools were rated "Excellent with Distinction", for the 16th consecutive year, the district earned the “What Parents Want” in education designation from SchoolMatch.

In 2009, the Westerville Alumni Association was formed to serve the graduates of the three current high schools (Westerville South, North, and Central) as well as the graduates of the original Westerville High School. The stated mission of the Association is to foster greater connections among the alumni community and to ensure the development and continued success of the Westerville high schools through student scholarships and teacher grants.

Schools

Elementary

Alcott Elementary
Annehurst Elementary
Cherrington Elementary
Emerson Elementary
Fouse Elementary
Hanby Elementary
Hawthorne Elementary
Huber Ridge Elementary
McVay Elementary
Mark Twain Elementary
Minerva France Elementary
Pointview Elementary
Robert Frost Elementary
Whittier Elementary
Wilder Elementary

Middle
Blendon Middle School
Genoa Middle School
Heritage Middle School
Walnut Springs Middle School

High
Westerville Central High School
Westerville North High School
Westerville South High School

References

External links

Education in Franklin County, Ohio
School districts in Ohio
Education in Delaware County, Ohio
Westerville, Ohio
School districts established in 1855
1855 establishments in Ohio